Dom Polycarpe de la Rivière was Carthusian prior of the 17th century, historian and scholar with a fertile imagination. Much of his life is surrounded in mystery and although he wrote biographies on numerous church identities he is considered generally to have been a fabricator. Among the persons about whom he wrote are:
St. Albinus (d. 262)
Castor d'Apt
Saint Eutrope of Orange
Hugues de Payns
Mellonius
listing the first bishop of Die as bishop St Mars c.220, then St Higher, and finally St Nicaise. Only the latter is attested.
Bishop Laugier of Digne (ca. 1050?), known only from a missing or fabricated charter, seen only by Polycarpe.
 claims Saint Marcel de Die,(his successor) wrote a letter from the First Council of Nicaea for Nicaise to forward to that bishops of Gaules, of this letter, no trace has ever been found.

Life
Polycarpe de la Rivière was a very mysterious person. 'Polycarpe de la Rivière' was a pseudonym and he spent considerable effort during his life to hide his age, birthplace and real name. Originally a Jesuit, he transferred to the Grande Chartreuse, where he eventually became a prior.

He was made prior of Bonpas in 1630. In 1639 he and two servants left to make a pilgrimage to the baths of Mont Dore, and were never heard of again.

Works

Even in his own life his works were considered to be controversial with many of his latter works banned.

 Angelica, immortal excellencies and perfections of the soul by Dom Polycarpe of the River, 4to, undated. (No. 407).
 Farewell world, or the contempt of his vain and perishable magnitudes pleasures by Dom Polycarpe of the River, Lyon, Pillehotte, 1621, 8vo, 2nd edition, frontisp. (No. 433)
1609: "Goodbye world or Mesprit of his vain and perishable magnitudes pleasures" published in 1619.
 In 1617 he also publishes "Spiritual Recreation on divine love and the good of souls" in this book is included for the first time an anagram of Polycarpe of the River: "I love to own the sky ".
 1618: "Farewell to the World" (fifth edition).
 1621: "The Sacred Mystery of Our Redemption" (three volumes).
 1618: The Eloquent Loving Thought or on the Song of Solomon. Found work.
 1619 and 1622: "Spiritual Recreations on divine love and the good of souls." With an anagram of Polycarp appears an element showing a phonetic cryptography system that Polycarp seems boldly master.
 1619, 1621, 1625, 1631 reissue of "Farewell of the world ..." but this time show his heraldic arms and motto: "Solutido mihi provincia".
 1625: "The penitent soul from the Cross"
 1626: "Angelica" His superior Polycarpe accuses of having written this book in French ... it regrets that it was not written in Latin to be booked ... more religious and less accessible! This book contains interesting observations on the natural history and innovative
1638 "Annals Ecclesiae. Urbis and Avenionensis comitatus. " Manuscript in two volumes.
 1638 "History of the city of Avignon." This volume is the result of two manuscripts. This book is forbidden by Rome despite all the interventions of canon Maselli.
 1640: "Historia Ordinis Cartusiensis". Publication ban requested by the same Carthusian order.
 "Catalogus Priorum Majoris Cartusiae Gratinano Politanae".
1636: "Historia Ecclesia Gallicanae, seu Natilia Episco patuum Galliae". The work suffers, as censorship has allowed only three volumes of the seventeen to be made available.
He also left a number of prayers and sermons

References

Priors